John Krokidas  is an American film director, screenwriter, and producer, best known for his directorial debut film, the 2013 biographical drama Kill Your Darlings.

Personal life
Krokidas attended Yale University, where he originally enrolled into acting. Krokidas graduated with a B.A. in theater and American studies, as well as a Distinction in the Major. He later attended New York University, where he studied the Graduate Film program. Krokidas has Greek, Italian, and Jewish ancestry. His maternal grandmother was Jewish.

He resides in New York and is openly gay.

Career
During his time at New York University, Krokidas began directing short films such as Shame No More (1999) and Slo-Mo (2001). After graduation, he signed a three-year contract with film company Miramax Films, having earlier done script coverage for the studio. In 2013, Krokidas directed, co-wrote and produced his first feature film, Kill Your Darlings, starring Daniel Radcliffe.

Filmography

Television

See also
 Dramatic license
 LGBT culture in New York City
 List of LGBT people from New York City

References

External links

1973 births
Living people
Writers from Springfield, Massachusetts
American television directors
American people of Italian descent
American people of Greek descent
American male screenwriters
American film producers
American gay writers
Jewish American writers
LGBT film directors
LGBT people from Massachusetts
American LGBT screenwriters
LGBT producers
Yale University alumni
Tisch School of the Arts alumni
Artists from Springfield, Massachusetts
Businesspeople from Springfield, Massachusetts
Film directors from Massachusetts
Screenwriters from Massachusetts